Patrick Davitt (born 19 August 1958) is an Irish boxer. He competed in the men's welterweight event at the 1980 Summer Olympics.

References

1958 births
Living people
Irish male boxers
Olympic boxers of Ireland
Boxers at the 1980 Summer Olympics
Sportspeople from Dublin (city)
Welterweight boxers